Leukostasis (also called symptomatic hyperleukocytosis) is a medical emergency most commonly seen in patients with acute myeloid leukemia. It is characterized by an extremely elevated blast cell count and symptoms of decreased tissue perfusion. The pathophysiology of leukostasis is not well understood, but inadequate delivery of oxygen to the body's cells is the result. Leukostasis is diagnosed when white cell plugs are seen in the microvasculature. The most common symptoms are dyspnea and hypoxia, usually accompanied by visual changes, headaches, dizziness, confusion, somnolence, and coma. Prompt treatment is required since, if left untreated, it has a very high mortality rate. Treatments aim to rapidly reduce white blood cell counts while also treating the underlying disorder.

Asymptomatic hyperleukocytosis and symptomatic hyperleukocytosis (leukostasis) 

Symptomatic Hyperleukocytosis (Leukostasis) is defined by a tremendously high blast cell count along with symptoms of decreased tissue perfusion. Leukostasis is associated with people who have bone and blood disorders and is very common among people with acute myeloid leukemia or chronic myeloid leukemia. Leukostasis is a pathologic diagnosis that inhibits efficient flow to the microvasculature of the body. Continued and untreated leukostasis presents respiratory and neurological distress simultaneously and is a medical emergency, with untreated patient mortality rates reaching a minimum of 20 and a maximum of 40 percent. A leukemia blood cell count greater than 50 x 10^9/ L (50,000 / microL) or 100 x 10^9 L / (100,000/ microL) signifies hyperleukocytosis. Symptoms of leukostasis start when blood levels of leukocytes reach over 100 x 10^9 / L (100,000 / microL). As stated before, these counts are critical and associated with Leukemias.

Symptoms and signs 
When a patient has symptomatic leukocytosis, specifically caused by a form of leukemia, it is common to find leukostasis in all their organs. The majority of the time a patient dies from neurological complications (40% of patients die due to neurological conditions) as opposed to particular organ damage. The lungs alone account for approximately 30 percent of leukostasis fatalities. All other organs combined attribute to 30 percent of deaths, with the major outliers being neurological and respiratory failure equating to 70 percent of all death rates. Damage to the microvasculature of the body is the primary cause of death by leukostasis. Microvasculature damage to the lungs is only second to neurological damage because the body is already experiencing hypoxic conditions, which lead to lung tissue damage as the second leading cause of fatalities.

Pulmonary signs - Dyspnea and hypoxia with or without diffuse interstitial or alveolar infiltrates on imaging studies.

Neurological signs - visual changes, headaches, dizziness, tinnitus, gait instability, confusion, somnolence, coma.

The most common symptom is the patient is usually febrile, which is often linked with inflammation and possible infection.

Less common signs include: myocardial ischemia / right ventricular overload, increased acute kidney injury, priapism, acute limb ischemia and bowel infarction.

Causes of asymptomatic/symptomatic hyperleukocytosis (leukostasis)

Hyperleukocytosis is very common in acutely ill patients. It occurs in response to a wide variety of conditions, including viral, bacterial, fungal, or parasitic infection, cancer, hemorrhage, and exposure to certain medications.

For lung diseases such as pneumonia and tuberculosis, white blood cell count is crucial for the diagnosis of the disease, as leukocytosis is usually present.

Specific medications, including corticosteroids, lithium and beta-agonists can cause hyperleukocytosis.

Pathophysiology
The mechanism in which hyperleukocytosis or leukostasis manifests and disrupts homeostasis is greatly associated with leukemia's but multiple other factors may cause leukocytosis. Major types of leukocytosis and their mechanisms depend on the types of leukemia that cause them. White blood cell levels either rise in distinct white blood levels or in unison with others, a patient may have neutrophilia, lymphocytosis, monocytosis, eosinophilia, basophilia or a rise in immature blast cells.

Acute myeloid leukemia - 10 to 20 percent of patients newly diagnosed with this type leukemia have hyperleukocytosis.

Acute lymphoblastic leukemia - 20 to 30 percent of patients newly diagnosed with this type of leukemia have hyperleukocytosis.

Chronic lymphocytic leukemia - Exact percentage of people diagnosed with chronic lymphocytic leukemia is unknown but a significant number also have hyperleukocytosis.

Chronic myeloid leukemia - The majority of patients with chronic myeloid leukemia usually have hyperleukocytosis.

The primary pathophysiology of leukostasis is not completely understood, but there are two possible theories.

Theory 1
Increased blood viscosity due to large leukemic blast populations which are less deformable than mature leukocytes may lead to leukostasis. The accumulation of less malleable blast products in the bloodstream accumulate within the microcirculation causing an accumulation of blockages leading to leukostasis.

Theory 2
Hypoxic events in body regions may increase the high metabolic activity of dividing blast cells and lead to an increase in cytokine production. The increasing levels of cytokines within tissues may result in endothelial damage and subsequent hemorrhage. Therefore, hypoxia, in addition to various cytokine accumulations, act in unison to further damage tissue and attract leukemic blast cells to form a triad of damage.

The combination of these theories, in addition to other events, may lead to hyperleukocytosis.

Diagnosis 
White blood counts exceeding 100 x 10^9 / L (100,000 / microL) present symptoms of tissue hypoxia and may signal possible neurological and respiratory distress. Ongoing research has shown that patients have experienced hypoxia at leukocyte levels below 100 x 10^9 / L (100,000 / microL), therefore patients with leukemia need regular neurological and respiratory monitoring when leukocyte counts are approaching 100 x 10^9 / L (100,000 / microL) to decrease chances of tissue hypoxia.  Acquired biopsies are examined for damage to microvasculature, which serves as evidence of hypoxia through the identification of leukocyte blockage within the tissue. Due to the biopsy's invasive nature and the risks associated with the procedure, it is only used when deemed necessary.

Measurements for arterial pO2 have shown to be falsely decreased in patients with hyperleukocytosis because of white blood cells ability to utilize oxygen. Pulse oximetry should be used to more accurately assess pO2 levels of a patient suspected to have leukocytosis. Automated blood cell counters may be inaccurate due to fragments of blast cells being labeled on blood smears as platelets. The most accurate form of confirming platelet counts is by using a manual platelet count and a review of a peripheral smear. Serum potassium levels may also be artificially elevated by a release from leukemic blasts during in vitro clotting process, therefore serum potassium levels should be monitored by heparinized (the addition of heparin prevents coagulation) plasma samples in order to obtain accurate results of potassium levels. Disseminated intravascular coagulation may occur in a significant number of patients with presentation of various degrees of thrombin generation, followed by decreased fibrinogen and increased fibrinolysis.

Spontaneous tumor lysis syndrome is present in approximately 10 percent of patients with leukostasis. Lab tests are used to measure the potential of elevated serum concentrations such as uric acid, potassium, phosphate, and hypocalcemia.

Disseminated intravascular coagulation and spontaneous tumor lysis syndrome can develop before and after chemotherapy treatment. Patients undergoing this type of therapy need to be closely monitored before and after, in addition to undergoing prophylactic measures to prevent possible complications.

Prevention
Since leukostasis and hyperleukostasis are associated with leukemia, preventive treatments are taken upon diagnosis.

Patients with hyperleukocytosis associated with leukemia are always considered candidates for tumor lysis syndrome prophylaxis in addition to aggressive intravenous hydration with allopurinol or rasburicase to decrease serum uric acid levels.

Treatment 

Treatment includes utilization of prophylactic methods if the patient has been diagnosed with hyperleukocytosis. This is usually in combination with other treatments, which are dependent on the type of leukemia. Specific treatments include lysis syndrome treatment in addition to aggressive intravenous hydration with allopurinol or rasburicase to decrease serum uric acid levels.

Hematopoietic cell transplants are critical to correct leukostasis and leukemia. Cytoreduction is also a critical course of treatment in order to rapidly decrease white blood cell counts. Twenty to forty percent of patients diagnosed with hyperleukocytosis die within the first week of symptom presentation. Patients with the best outcome have none or limited symptoms of respiratory or neurological distress. An accumulation of these symptoms lead to decreased levels of statistical survival compared to patients diagnosed with asymptomatic hyperleukocytosis alone. Cytoreduction methods include chemotherapy, utilizing the drug hydroxyurea (Hydroxyurea is usually used in asymptomatic hyperleukocytosis), and the less common leukapheresis procedure. This procedure is often utilized for asymptomatic hyperleukocytosis patients who have induction chemotherapy postponed for patient-specific factors.

Variants of chemotherapy, including induction chemotherapy, are used to treat both elevated white blood cells counts while simultaneously targeting leukemia cells in the bone marrow.

Prognosis
Prognosis of patients with hyperleukocytosis is dependent on the cause and type of leukemia the patient has. Patients diagnosed with asymptomatic hyperleukocytosis have significantly better survival rates than symptomatic hyperleukocytosis (leukostasis). Preventative measures and contentious monitoring of patients diagnosed with leukemia is critical in receiving treatment as early as possible to prevent and treat hyperleukocytosis.

Recent research 
Recent and continuing research has shown that patients have had hypoxia at leukocyte levels below 100 x 10^9 / L (100,000 / microL), therefore patients with leukemia need regular neurological and respiratory monitoring when leukocyte counts are approaching 100 x 10^9 / L (100,000 / microL) to decrease chances of hypoxia.

Leukemia and population types are also believed to be associated with possible symptoms and may require a change in treatment.

Results of Tumor lysis/ consumption of coagulopathy in patients with acute leukemia is much more often than in patients with chronic malignant hematological diseases.
 Data retrieved for reference is 2017

Leukostasis, also known as symptomatic hyperleukocytosis, is a life-threatening complication of various leukemias characterized by an excess of white blood cells in the bloodstream. Hyperleukocytosis is arbitrarily defined as greater than 100,000 white blood cells per microliter of blood. The condition is characterized by abnormal aggregation and clumping of white blood cells in the blood vessels resulting in impaired blood flow and delivery of oxygen to the body's cells. The brain and lungs are the two most commonly affected organs. Leukostasis most commonly occurs with acute myeloid leukemia.

Hyperleukocytosis/leukostasis occurs more commonly, and at lower white blood cell (WBC) counts, in acute myeloid leukemia than in acute lymphocytic leukemia, because the cells of acute myeloid leukemia have a larger corpuscular (cell) volume than those of acute lymphocytic leukemia, and the cells of acute myeloid leukemia have more surface adhesion molecules than those of acute lymphocytic leukemia (i.e., the cancer cells in AML are "stickier").

Signs and symptoms
Individuals affected by leukostasis may present with respiratory symptoms such as cough, difficulty breathing, breathing too quickly, or inadequate levels of oxygen in the blood requiring support with a mechanical ventilator. Neurologic symptoms, such as temporary confusion, blurry vision, dizziness, ringing in the ears, ataxia, stupor, sleepiness, headaches, and coma, may be seen. Neurologic signs such as seizures, focal neurologic deficits (e.g., weakness in one arm or leg), swelling of the retina, retinal bleeding, and dilated blood vessels on inspection of the back of the eye. Rare complications of leukostasis include renal vein thrombosis, priapism, and acute ischemia of the leg.

Pathophysiology
The pathophysiology of leukostasis is not well understood. Inadequate delivery of oxygen to the body's cells is thought to be the main abnormal result of leukostasis. Proposed mechanisms for this include increased blood viscosity due to the high number of white blood cells circulating in the blood and a higher proportion of cells with a greater mean corpuscular volume (larger cells) with decreased deformability occupying the blood vessels. However, certain studies have demonstrated that the blood viscosity of affected individuals is not increased due to a compensatory decrease in the number of red blood cells sometimes resulting in anemia and a decreased hematocrit.

Diagnosis
The clinical signs and symptoms of leukostasis are non-specific but should be suspected in susceptible individuals with leukemia, a high white blood cell count (e.g., over 100,000), and new-onset neurologic or respiratory signs or symptoms. Rales may be heard when listening to the lungs with a stethoscope.

A chest x-ray can be normal in those with leukostasis or may demonstrate an alveolar pattern of infiltrates. Brain imaging with computed tomography (CT) or magnetic resonance imaging (MRI) is useful and can demonstrate areas of bleeding, ischemic stroke, or masses.

Laboratory abnormalities seen in those with leukostasis include a markedly elevated white blood cell count (hyperleukocytosis) and electrolyte abnormalities seen with tumor lysis syndrome such as high concentrations of potassium, phosphorus, and uric acid in the blood and a low level of calcium in the blood (due to being bound by high amounts of circulating phosphorus).

Management
It is an acute syndrome requiring aggressive cytoreductive modalities including chemotherapy and/or leukapheresis to both reduce the number of circulating leukocytes and to break apart any aggregates that have already formed. Such rapid and massive lysis of tissue poses a risk of complications (tumor lysis syndrome), but it is necessary to avoid a stroke.

Leukostasis is different from leukemic infiltration, which is a neoplastic process where leukemic cells invade organs.

Prognosis
Leukostasis is a high-risk condition and can lead to significant complications resulting from occlusion of blood vessels, including transient ischemic attacks and strokes.

Epidemiology
The incidence and prevalence of hyperleukocytosis and leukostasis vary depending on the form of leukemia. Hyperleukocytosis is common in chronic myelogenous leukemia and chronic lymphocytic leukemia, but leukostasis rarely occurs. Similarly, the incidence of hyperleukocytosis in people with acute lymphoblastic leukemia is between 10 and 30% but rarely does this progress to symptomatic leukostasis. The incidence of hyperleukocytosis in acute myeloid leukemia (AML) ranges between 5-20% but leukostasis is less common than hyperleukocytosis in this population; leukostasis tends to occur more often in people with AML with monocytic features.

References

Blood disorders
Hematopathology
Leukemia
Oncological emergencies